Runtu Quri (Quechua runtu hail with large particles / egg, quri gold, "coarse-particle gold", Hispanicized spelling Runtucori) is a mountain in the Wansu mountain range in the Andes of Peru, about  high. It is situated in the Apurímac Region, Antabamba Province, Antabamba District. Runtu Quri lies northeast of Wallqa Wallqa.

See also 
 Inti Utka

References 

Mountains of Peru
Mountains of Apurímac Region